Otto Leodolter (18 March 1936 in Mariazell – 16 December 2020) was an Austrian ski jumper who competed between 1955 and 1964. His biggest success was a Bronze medal in the Individual Large Hill at the 1960 Winter Olympics in Squaw Valley.

Leodolter was the first Austrian to earn a medal in Nordic skiing.

Leodolter died in Ried im Innkreis on 16 December 2020, aged 84.

References

External links
 
 

Austrian male ski jumpers
Olympic ski jumpers of Austria
Ski jumpers at the 1956 Winter Olympics
Ski jumpers at the 1960 Winter Olympics
Ski jumpers at the 1964 Winter Olympics
1936 births
2020 deaths
Olympic medalists in ski jumping
Medalists at the 1960 Winter Olympics
Olympic bronze medalists for Austria
People from Bruck an der Mur District
Sportspeople from Styria
20th-century Austrian people